Ballynegall House (sometimes spelled "Ballynagall") is a ruined Regency-style country house in Ballynagall townland, County Westmeath, Ireland. The house was constructed around 1808 and was designed by the architect Francis Johnston.

Its gutting and fall into ruins was said to be one of great architectural losses in Ireland.

History
The house was originally built for James Gibbons and remained in the Gibbons name until 1846. It then passed by marriage to the Smyth family where it remained until the early 1960s.

The last owner Michael Hawkesworth Smyth sold the house with several hundred acres of good farming land for about £12,000 (even then a small amount). It changed hands until in 1981 many of the fine architectural pieces were gutted and sold (the fireplace alone was reported sold for £6,000) the house became a ruin. Many of the items from the house are still in existence today in other buildings: the fine portico found a new home at the entrance to the K Club, Straffan, County Kildare, and the Turner conservatory at the La Serre restaurant on the Lyons estate, Celbridge, County Kildare.

References

Buildings and structures in County Westmeath
Houses completed in 1808
1808 establishments in Ireland